The 2022 Empire Women's Indoor 2 was a professional tennis tournament played on indoor hard courts. It was the tenth edition of the tournament which was part of the 2022 ITF Women's World Tennis Tour. It took place in Trnava, Slovakia between 10 and 16 October 2022.

Champions

Singles

  Eva Lys def.  Anna Karolína Schmiedlová, 6–2, 4–6, 6–2

Doubles

  Sofya Lansere /  Rebecca Šramková def.  Lee Pei-chi /  Wu Fang-hsien, 4–6, 6–2, [11–9]

Singles main draw entrants

Seeds

 1 Rankings are as of 3 October 2022.

Other entrants
The following players received wildcards into the singles main draw:
  Nikola Daubnerová
  Lucie Havlíčková
  Ela Pláteníková

The following player received entry into the singles main draw using a junior exempt:
  Petra Marčinko

The following players received entry from the qualifying draw:
  Timea Jarušková
  Linda Klimovičová
  Aneta Laboutková
  Lee Pei-chi
  Lola Radivojević
  Arlinda Rushiti
  Rebecca Šramková
  Stephanie Wagner

The following players received entry as Lucky Losers:
  Mara Guth
  Tayisiya Morderger
  Yana Morderger

References

External links
 2022 Empire Women's Indoor 2 at ITFtennis.com
 Official website

2022 ITF Women's World Tennis Tour
2022 in Slovak sport
October 2022 sports events in Slovakia